The Country Place Era was a period, from about 1890 to 1930, of American landscape architecture design during which wealthy Americans commissioned extensive gardens at their country estates, emulating European gardens that the Americans had seen in their European travels. An example is Castle Hill in Ipswich, Massachusetts.

Landscape architects that were involved included Charles Gillette, Frederick Law Olmsted, Charles Adam Platt, and Beatrix Farrand. Marian Cruger Coffin, an early female architect, was another participant as well as Ellen Shipman and Beatrix Farrand.

See also
Twin Bridges Rural Historic District, Pennsylvania
Historic Country Estates in Lake County, Ohio

References

Landscape architecture